Major General Bengt Arne Vilhelm Lönnbom (born 22 July 1933) was a Swedish Air Force officer. Lönnbom served as Chief of the Air Staff from 1984 to 1987 and as military commander of the Lower Norrland Military District from 1987 to 1993.

Early life
Lönnbom was born on 22 July 1933 in Lund's City Parish (Lunds stadsförsamling) in Malmöhus County, Sweden.

Career

Military career
Lönnbom graduated from the Swedish Air Force Flying School in 1956 and was commissioned as an officer the same year at Scania Wing with the rank of second lieutenant, where he served from 1956 to 1967, including as division commander. He was promoted to lieutenant in 1958 and to captain in 1964. Lönnbom served as head of the office in the Department of Studies in the Defence Staff from 1967 to 1968 and he was promoted to major in 1969. Lönnbom served in the Planning and Budget Department at the Ministry of Defence from 1972 to 1975 and was head of the office in the Planning Department in the Air Staff from 1975 to 1977. In 1977, Lönnbom was promoted to colonel, whereupon from 1977 to 1979 he was deputy commander of Bråvalla Wing in Norrköping. After promotion to senior colonel in 1979, he was head of the Aviation Section in the staff of the Upper Norrland Military District from 1979 to 1981. From 1981 to 1982, Lönnbom served as head of the Chief of the Air Force's project group for JAS and from 1982 to 1984 as head of the Systems Department in the Main Department for Aircraft Equipment in the Defence Materiel Administration. Lönnbom was promoted to major general in 1984, after which he served as Chief of the Air Staff from 1984 to 1987 and as the last military commander of Lower Norrland Military District from 1987 to 1993.

Business career
Lönnbom has been chairman of the board of Polydisplay AB and chairman of the Swedish part of AFCEA. In 1991 he became CEO of Carubel AB. He became chairman of the board in 2001.

Dates of rank
1956 – Second Lieutenant
1958 – Lieutenant
1964 – Captain
1969 – Major
1972 – Lieutenant colonel
1977 – Colonel
1979 – Senior colonel
1984 – Major general

Honours
Member of the Royal Swedish Academy of War Sciences (1980)

Bibliography

References

1933 births
Living people
Swedish Air Force major generals
People from Lund
Members of the Royal Swedish Academy of War Sciences